Warehouse: Songs and Stories is the sixth and final studio album by punk rock band Hüsker Dü, originally released by Warner Bros. Records as a double album on two vinyl LPs. The band dissolved following the tour in support of its release, in part due to disagreements between songwriters Bob Mould and Grant Hart over the latter's drug use. This album, along with Candy Apple Grey, showcases the increasing maturity of Mould and Hart's writing—a change which alienated some long-time fans. This album is also known for its battle between the two songwriters, with Mould famously telling Hart that he would never have more than half of the songs on a Hüsker Dü album.

Mould later said that this time period was a "rough stretch", but that Warehouse was still a "good record." "Had it been pared back to a single record it might have had more impact, but we were already loggerheads at that point."

The album's title comes from the fact that the group had rented some warehouse space in which to write and rehearse; a change from their former practice of writing new material and testing it out on live audiences.

During the recording sessions, Hart and Mould replaced a few of Greg Norton's bass tracks for their respective songs when Norton's own contributions were not to their liking. In his autobiography, Mould identified Hart's "Charity, Chastity, Prudence and Hope" as one of the songs whose bass lines were rerecorded, uncredited, by their composers.

"Could You Be the One?", was released as a single and video. Other singles released from the album were "She's a Woman (And Now He Is a Man)" and "Ice Cold Ice", with "Tell You Why Tomorrow" also seeing a release as a promotional single. Warehouse: Songs and Stories peaked at #117 on the Billboard Top 200 and also charted for a week on the UK Albums Chart at #72.  Hüsker Dü was interviewed and performed "Could You Be the One?" and "She's a Woman (And Now He is a Man)" live on The Late Show With Joan Rivers on April 27, 1987.

A cover version of "Up in the Air" was included on Heidi Berry's album Love.

Accolades
The album was included in the book 1001 Albums You Must Hear Before You Die.

Track listing
CD releases of Warehouse: Songs and Stories combine all the songs onto a single disc.

Personnel
Bob Mould – guitar, bass guitar, keyboards, vocals
Grant Hart – drums, bass guitar, keyboards, percussion, vocals
Greg Norton – bass guitar, vocals

Production
Producers: Bob Mould, Grant Hart
Engineer: Steven Fjelstad
Mastering: Howie Weinberg
Photography: Daniel Corrigan, Hüsker Dü

References

Hüsker Dü albums
1987 albums
Albums produced by Bob Mould
Warner Records albums